Prolyonetia is an extinct genus of moths in the family Lyonetiidae. The single species Prolyonetia cockerelli Kusnetzov, 1941, has been described from Baltic amber.

References

External links 
Butterflies and Moths of the World Generic Names and their Type-species

†
Fossil Lepidoptera
Baltic amber